Local elections were held in the province of Marinduque on May 9, 2016, as part of the 2016 general election. Voters selected candidates for all local positions: a town mayor, vice mayor and town councilors, as well as members of the Sangguniang Panlalawigan, a vice-governor, a governor and a representative for the lone district of Marinduque in the House of Representatives.

In this election, a number of provincial-level officials are seeking reelection, including incumbent governor Carmencita Reyes and incumbent congresswoman Regina O. Reyes.

Results

Governor
Carmencita Reyes is the incumbent.

Vice Governor
Romulo Bacorro is the incumbent.

District Representative
Regina Ongsiako Reyes was the congresswoman from June 30, 2013 - February 1, 2016. Reyes was disqualified by the Supreme Court due to issues with her citizenship. Lord Allan Jay Q. Velasco was sworn on February 1, 2016, becoming the incumbent representative.

Provincial Board elections

1st District

Municipality: Boac, Mogpog, Gasan

|colspan=5 bgcolor=black|

2nd District
Municipality: Sta. Cruz, Torrijos, Buenavista

|colspan=5 bgcolor=black|

Municipal elections

Parties are as stated in their certificates of candidacy.

Boac

Mayor
Roberto Madla is the incumbent.

Vice Mayor
Incumbent Dante Marquez is not running for re-election. Despite listed in the ballot as an Independent, Luisito Laylay later joined the Liberal Party.

Mogpog

Mayor
Incumbent Mayor Senen Livelo, Jr. is term limited and not running for any other political position.  His brother, Municipal Administrator Augusto Leo Livelo, is the party's nominee.

Vice Mayor
Incumbent Vice Mayor Rolando Mantala is running for mayor.

Gasan

Mayor
Incumbent Mayor Victoria L. Lim is term limited and is running for governor.  Her sister-in-law, Lisa J. Lao, is running for mayor in her stead, although they don't belong to the same political party.

Vice Mayor
Yudel Sosa is the incumbent.

Santa Cruz

Mayor
Incumbent Mayor Wilfredo Red is retiring from politics, her daughter Marisa is the party's nominee.

Vice Mayor
Incumbent Vice Mayor Ishmael Lim is running for mayor.

Torrijos

Mayor
Incumbent Mayor Gil Briones is term limited and running for councilor. Notably, Ang Mata'y Alagaan party-list representative Lorna Velasco, wife of Supreme Court Associate Justice Presbitero Velasco and mother of Lord Allan Jay Velasco, is running for mayor.

Vice Mayor
Incumbent Vice Mayor Roberto Macdon is running for mayor.

Buenavista

Mayor
Russel Madrigal is the incumbent.

Vice Mayor
Bert Fabrero is the incumbent, he took the post upon the death of Montano Saguid in October 2013.

References

 Marinduque Election 2016. Marinduque, Philippines. List of Local Candidates for Verification. http://electionsph.blogspot.com/2014/11/elections2016-candidates-province-Marinduque.html
Philippines Election 2016. Wikipedia,Politics and Governance of the Philippines General Candidates 2016, voters registration, p. 1.2

2016 Philippine local elections
Elections in Marinduque